Ras-related protein Rab-22A is a protein that in humans is encoded by the RAB22A gene.

The protein encoded by this gene is a member of the RAB family of small GTPases. The GTP-bound form of the encoded protein has been shown to interact with early-endosomal antigen 1, and may be involved in the trafficking of and interaction between endosomal compartments.

References

Further reading